The 1967–68 season is the 88th season of competitive football by Rangers.

Overview
Rangers played a total of 51 competitive matches during the 1967–68 season.

Results
All results are written with Rangers' score first.

Scottish First Division

Inter-Cities Fairs Cup

Scottish Cup

League Cup

Appearances

See also
 1967–68 in Scottish football
 1967–68 Scottish Cup
 1967–68 Scottish League Cup
 1967–68 Inter-Cities Fairs Cup

References 

Rangers F.C. seasons
Rangers
Rangers